Thomas Trumble,  (9 April 1872 – 2 July 1954) was a career Australian public servant who was appointed acting Secretary of the Department of Defence during the First World War, and Secretary from 1918 to 1927.

Trumble was the first Secretary who did not have a military background. After his Secretary role, he subsequently served as official secretary to the high commission for Australia in London, and Australian Defence Liaison Officer in London, retiring in 1932. During the Second World War, he was welcomed when he returned to public service from 1940 to 1943 as director of voluntary services, Department of Defence Co-ordination.

His older brothers Billy and Hugh played Test cricket for Australia.

References

1872 births
1954 deaths
Secretaries of the Australian Department of Defence
Australian Companions of the Order of St Michael and St George
Australian Commanders of the Order of the British Empire
People from Ararat, Victoria
People from Camberwell, Victoria
Australian people of Northern Ireland descent
Australian people of Scottish descent
People educated at Wesley College (Victoria)